Mid- Wicket Tales with Naseeruddin Shah is an Indian television Hindi entertainment cricket based show which aired on the Epic Channel. The show is hosted by veteran actor Naseeruddin Shah. In his own versatile narrative style, Shah explores the many interesting untold stories of Indian cricket. It is now available on EPIC ON, EPIC TV's streaming platform.

Show summary
‘Mid-Wicket Tales with Naseeruddin Shah’ takes viewers on a journey of many untold stories of Indian cricket. Naseeruddin Shah, a distinguished Bollywood actor and theatre person, brings alive the experiences on-screen through his unique story-telling.  Each episode covers various aspects and attributes of the game interspersed with trivia and anecdotes.

The show takes on several themes in each episode like captains, fast bowlers, spinners, wicket-keepers, glamour and more. The show captures many personalities narrating cricketing experiences and stories including Sharmila Tagore on Tiger Pataudi, Shashi Tharoor, Nari Contractor, Bishan Singh Bedi, Charu Sharma among others. Some of the cricketers featured on the show are Tiger Pataudi, Kapil Dev, Vijay Hazare, Syed Kirmani, Ravi Shastri, Farookh Engineer and M S Dhoni.

Show themes
 Episode 1 - Our Glorious Openers
 Episode 2 - The Captains of Our Destiny
 Episode 3 - India's Extraordinary Spinners
 Episode 4 - Patrons of Indian Cricket
 Episode 5 - Fantastic Pacers of India
 Episode 6 - India at The World Cups
 Episode 7 - Agents of Change
 Episode 8 - Our Stylish Left-Handers
 Episode 9 - India in England
 Episode 10 - Brave Hearts of Indian Cricket
 Episode 11 - Our Dynamic Wicket-keepers
 Episode 12 - The Amazing All-Rounders
 Episode 13 - IND vs PAK - The Epic Rivalry
 Episode 14 - Teenage Sensations
 Episode 15 - Men of Steel
 Episode 16 - Vital Victories
 Episode 17 - Monikers of Indian Cricketers
 Episode 18 - India's Cricketing Families
 Episode 19 - Stylish Stroke Players
 Episode 20 - A Caribbean Affair
 Episode 21 - Small Town Heroes
 Episode 22 - Glorious Comebacks
 Episode 23 - Bastions of Indian Cricket
 Episode 24 - Beyond The Boundary
 Episode 25 - Blistering Batsmen
 Episode 26 - Glamour and Cricket

Production
The show is produced by Greymatter Films.

References

Hindi-language television shows
Cricket on television
2015 Indian television series debuts
Epic TV original programming
Indian sports television series
Indian television talk shows